Michael Lewis (born 1959) is a South African-born British businessman in the fashion industry, and chairman of Foschini Group.

Early life
Lewis earned bachelor's and master's degrees from the University of Cape Town.

In the 1930s, his grandfather Meyer Lewis founded the Lewis furniture retail chain, and in the 1980s, his father Stanley Lewis acquired a controlling stake in Foschini Group.

Career
Lewis has been chairman of Foschini Group since 2015.

He is an independent director at Histogenics Corporation, a partner at Oceana Investment Partners LLP, chairman at Oceana Investment Corp Ltd, and chairman at Strandbags Holdings Pty Ltd. He is on the board of directors at Histogenics Corp, Oceana Capital Partners LLP, Oceana Fund Managers (Jersey) Ltd., United Trust Bank Ltd., and Oceana Concentrated Opportunities Fund Ltd.

Personal life
Lewis moved to London in the 1980s. In 1985, he married Leola. They have three adult children, and are now divorced.

Lewis is Jewish, and in 2011, his family donated £3 million to the University of Oxford to fund the appointment of a Professor of Israel Studies.

In January 2020, his engagement to English fashion model, Lady Kitty Spencer, was announced. They married on 24 July 2021 at the Villa Aldobrandini in Rome.

References

Living people
1959 births
20th-century South African businesspeople
University of Cape Town alumni
British businesspeople in fashion
British Jews
South African Jews
20th-century British businesspeople
21st-century British businesspeople
21st-century South African businesspeople
South African businesspeople in fashion
Michael